N. C. Karunya is an Indian playback singer, stage performer, YouTuber, songwriter, and TV show host. His rise to fame was the reality show Indian Idol (Season 2) on Sony Entertainment Television. After Indian Idol he became a recording artist by singing for more than 200 projects in Hindi, Telugu, Tamil, Kannada and Bengali but his mainstay has been Telugu, his mother tongue. He has also hosted various musical reality shows. In 2017, he launched his own YouTube channel and started releasing singles composed, written, and arranged by himself.

Early life and career

N.C.Karunya was born on 1 March 1986, to N. C. Madhu and P. Janaki in Hyderabad, India. He has been training in Carnatic classical under his Guru, "Vaaggeya Vidwanmani" Sri N.C. Murthy since the year 2000 and still continues to do so.

He was the winner of Padutha Theeyaga Junior series, 1998. N.C. Karunya was a participant of the second season of Indian Idol. He was placed as a runner up to fellow contestant, Sandeep Acharya. Karunya hosted the reality show Little Champs on Zee Telugu, Airtel "Saptaswaralu", on ETV, Vijetha-Voice of Andhra on local TV with M. M. Keeravani as the judge and Super Singer 8, on Maa TV with again M. M. Keeravani and also Smt. K.S.Chitra as the judges.

Films 
After the end of Indian Idol 2, Karunya was called for an audition by Vidhu Vinod Chopra for Lage Raho Munnabhai. He began his playback career by singing for Sanjay Dutt. Then he sang a song in Jai Santoshi Maa for Anu Malik. After that, he went to Hyderabad to meet members of the Telugu film industry who rooted for him during "Indian Idol". In that series of meetings when he met Jr. NTR , he was offered his first Telugu hit "Ekaantangaa unna" by NTR himself, a song composed by Mani Sharma, for the film Ashok. After this song, he went on to record songs like "Orugalluke Pilla" from the film Sainikudu, Enduko from Chirutha, "123 Nenoka Kantri" from Kantri, Ammayi Kitiki Pakkana from Maryada Ramanna, Om Namo Siva Rudraya from Khaleja, Oola Oolala Ala from Orange, Vayyarala jabilli from Pawan Kalyan's Teenmar, "Andam andam" from Vetadu-Ventadu, composed by Yuvan Shankar Raja, starring Vishal (actor), "Meher meher" from "D for Dopidi", "Suvvi Suvvaalamma" from the movie Loafer, two songs for "It's my love story" and many more.

He was the voice behind the short film made by Allu Arjun and director Sukumar, I Am That Change.

Karunya was the youngest singer to be a part of the remake of the song "Mile sur mera tumhaara". It was remade in 2010 and released as "Phir mile sur" on republic day on Zoom TV.

Independent music 
Karunya released his first Hindi album, the self-titled Karunya, on 9 August 2008. The music was composed by Lesle Lewis and the video was directed by the sister of Madhu Sarkar. His second album was a light music album named Karunya's Vandebhaavagurum. He also released four singles. He released the song "O Priyathamaa" on Jun 9, 2017, "Prema Geethika" on August 10, 2017, "Maayarogam" on Apr 14, 2018, and "Karuninchele" on Aug 23, 2019. His music video for "O Priyathamaa" reached 1 million+ views on Youtube.

Live performance 
Karunya has performed in numerous concerts in India plus concerts in America, performed in The Emirates, Singapore and East Africa and West Africa.

Discography

References

External links 

1986 births
Living people
Indian male playback singers
Telugu playback singers
Indian Idol participants
Filmfare Awards South winners
Singers from Hyderabad, India